Korean Wall may refer to: 
 Cheolli Jangseong, the 11th century northern defense structure,
 Korean Wall, North Korean propaganda of a supposed concrete wall along the Korean Demilitarized Zone